Clement Plumsted (baptism 2 May 1680, in London, England? – 26 May 1745, in Philadelphia) was Mayor of Philadelphia in 1723, 1736, and 1741. He also served as a Philadelphia councilman, alderman, and justice, as well as on the Pennsylvania provincial council. He was the father of William Plumsted, who also served as mayor of Philadelphia.

References

1680 births
1745 deaths
American people of English descent
Mayors of Philadelphia
People of colonial Pennsylvania
English emigrants